The 2019–20 Colorado State Rams men's basketball team represented Colorado State University during the 2019–20 NCAA Division I men's basketball season. The team was coached by Niko Medved in his second season. The Rams played their home games at Moby Arena on CSU's main campus in Fort Collins, Colorado as members of the Mountain West Conference. They finished the season 20–12, 11–7 in Mountain West play to finish in a tie for fifth place. They lost in the first round of the Mountain West tournament to Wyoming.

Previous season
The Rams finished the 2018–19 season 12–20, 7–11 in Mountain West play to finish in a three-way tie for seventh place. They lost in the first round of the Mountain West tournament to Boise State.

Offseason

Departures

Incoming transfers

2019 recruiting class

2020 recruiting class

Roster

Schedule and results

|-
!colspan=9 style=| Exhibition

|-
!colspan=9 style=| Regular season

|-
!colspan=9 style=| Mountain West tournament

Source

References 

Colorado State Rams men's basketball seasons
Colorado State
Colorado State Rams
Colorado State Rams